The Homorodul Vechi is a tributary of the river Someș in Romania and Hungary. It crosses the Hungarian border between Boghiș and Csengerújfalu.

References

Rivers of Romania
Rivers of Hungary
Rivers of Satu Mare County